Nebria shibanaii shibanaii is a subspecies of ground beetle in the Nebriinae subfamily that is endemic to Kuril Islands, Russia.

References

shibanaii shibanaii
Beetles described in 1955
Beetles of Asia
Endemic fauna of Russia